Männik is an Estonian surname (meaning "pine forest"), and may refer to:
 (born 1947), composer
 (1906–1966), writer
Jaanus Männik (born 1951), politician
 (born 1948), jurist

See also
Mänd
Männiku (disambiguation)

Estonian-language surnames